Luca Dodi (born 26 May 1987 in Parma, Emilia-Romagna, Italy) is an Italian former cyclist. He rode in the 2013 Vuelta a España and finished 129th overall.

Major results
2007
1st Overall Giro di Romagna Ciclistico Pesche nettarine
1st Memorial Davide Fardelli
2009
1st Caduti di Soprazocco
2012
 9th Coppa Placci

References

1987 births
Living people
Italian male cyclists
Sportspeople from Parma
Cyclists from Emilia-Romagna